Sean Michael Jenkins (born February 22, 1966) is a United States Army major general who most recently served as the commander of the Joint Enabling Capabilities Command since July 2019 to July 2021. Prior to that, he served as the Chief of the Office of Security Cooperation-Iraq.

References

External links
 

Living people
Place of birth missing (living people)
United States Army generals
1966 births